In Spain, an autonomous community is the first-level political and administrative division, created in accordance with the Spanish Constitution of 1978, with the aim of guaranteeing limited autonomy of the nationalities and regions that make up Spain.

Spain is not a federation, but a decentralised unitary country. While sovereignty is vested in the nation as a whole, represented in the central institutions of government, the nation has, in variable degrees, devolved power to the communities, which, in turn, exercise their right to self-government within the limits set forth in the constitution and their autonomous statutes. Each community has its own set of devolved powers; typically those communities with stronger local nationalism have more powers, and this type of devolution has been called asymmetrical. Some scholars have referred to the resulting system as a federal system in all but name, or a "federation without federalism".
There are 17 autonomous communities and two autonomous cities that are collectively known as "autonomies". The two autonomous cities have the right to become autonomous communities, but neither has yet exercised it. This unique framework of territorial administration is known as the "State of Autonomies".

The autonomous communities are governed according to the constitution and their own organic laws known as Statutes of Autonomy, which define the powers that they assume. Since devolution was intended to be asymmetrical in nature, the scope of powers varies for each community, but all have the same parliamentary structure; in fact, despite the Constitution not setting a mandatory legislative chamber framework, all autonomous communities have chosen unicameralism.

Autonomous communities 

RA: Regionally Appointed

DE: Directly Elected

Autonomous cities 

DE: Directly Elected

History

Background

Spain is a diverse country made up of several different regions with varying economic and social structures, as well as different languages and historical, political and cultural traditions. While the entire Spanish territory was united under one crown in 1479 this was not a process of national homogenization or amalgamation. The constituent territories—be they crowns, kingdoms, principalities or dominions—retained much of their former institutional existence, including limited legislative, judicial or fiscal autonomy. These territories also exhibited a variety of local customs, laws, languages and currencies until the mid 19th century.

From the 18th century onwards, the Bourbon kings and the government tried to establish a more centralized regime. Leading figures of the Spanish Enlightenment advocated for the building of a Spanish nation beyond the internal territorial boundaries. This culminated in 1833, when Spain was divided into 49 (now 50) provinces, which served mostly as transmission belts for policies developed in Madrid.

Spanish history since the late 19th century has been shaped by a dialectical struggle between Spanish nationalism and peripheral nationalisms, mostly in Catalonia and the Basque Country, and to a lesser degree in Galicia.

In a response to Catalan demands, limited autonomy was granted to the Commonwealth of Catalonia in 1914, only to be abolished in 1925. It was granted again in 1932 during the Second Spanish Republic, when the Generalitat, Catalonia's mediaeval institution of government, was restored. The constitution of 1931 envisaged a territorial division for all Spain in "autonomous regions", which was never fully attained—only Catalonia, the Basque Country and Galicia had approved "Statutes of Autonomy"—the process being thwarted by the Spanish Civil War that broke out in 1936, and the victory of the rebel Nationalist forces under Francisco Franco.

During General Franco's dictatorial regime, centralism was vigorously enforced as a way of preserving the "unity of the Spanish nation". Peripheral nationalism, along with communism and atheism were regarded by his regime as the main threats. His attempts to fight separatism with heavy-handed but sporadic repression, and his often severe suppression of language and regional identities backfired: the demands for democracy became intertwined with demands for the recognition of a pluralistic vision of the Spanish nationhood.

When Franco died in 1975, Spain entered into a phase of transition towards democracy. The most difficult task of the newly democratically elected Cortes Generales (the Spanish Parliament) in 1977 acting as a Constituent Assembly was to transition from a unitary centralized state into a decentralized state in a way that would satisfy the demands of the peripheral nationalists. The then Prime Minister of Spain, Adolfo Suárez, met with Josep Tarradellas, president of the Generalitat of Catalonia in exile. An agreement was made so that the Generalitat would be restored and limited competencies would be transferred while the constitution was still being written. Shortly after, the government allowed the creation of "assemblies of members of parliament" integrated by deputies and senators of the different territories of Spain, so that they could constitute "pre-autonomic regimes" for their regions as well. 

The Fathers of the Constitution had to strike a balance between the opposing views of Spain—on the one hand, the centralist view inherited from monarchist and nationalist elements of Spanish society, and on the other hand federalism and a pluralistic view of Spain as a "nation of nations"; between a uniform decentralization of entities with the same competencies and an asymmetrical structure that would distinguish the nationalities. Peripheral nationalist parties wanted a multinational state with a federal or confederal model, whereas the governing Union of the Democratic Centre (UCD) and the People's Alliance (AP) wanted minimum decentralization; the Spanish Socialist Workers' Party (PSOE) was sympathetic to a federal system.

In the end, the constitution, published and ratified in 1978, found a balance in recognizing the existence of "nationalities and regions" in Spain, within the "indissoluble unity of the Spanish nation". In order to manage the tensions present in the Spanish transition to democracy, the drafters of the current Spanish constitution avoided giving labels such as 'federal' to the territorial arrangements, while enshrining in the constitution the right to autonomy or self-government of the "nationalities and regions", through a process of asymmetric devolution of power to the "autonomous communities" that were to be created.

Constitution of 1978

The starting point in the territorial organization of Spain was the second article of the constitution, which reads:

The constitution was rather ambiguous on how this was to take place. It does not define, detail, or impose the structure of the state; it does not tell the difference between "nation" and "nationality"; and it does not specify which are the "nationalities" and which are the "regions", or the territories they comprise. Rather than imposing, it enables a process towards a decentralized structure based on the exercise that these "nationalities and regions" would make of the right to self-government that they were granted. As such, the outcome of this exercise was not predictable and its construction was deliberately open-ended; the constitution only created a process for an eventual devolution, but it was voluntary in nature: the "nationalities and regions" themselves had the option of choosing to attain self-government or not.

In order to exercise this right, the constitution established an open process whereby the "nationalities and regions" could be constituted as "autonomous communities". First, it recognized the pre-existing 50 provinces of Spain, a territorial division of the liberal centralizing regime of the 19th century created for purely administrative purposes (it also recognized the municipalities that integrated the provinces). These provinces would serve as the building blocks and constituent parts of the autonomous communities. The constitution stipulated that the following could be constituted as autonomous communities:
 Two or more adjacent provinces with common historical, cultural and economic characteristics.
 Insular territories.
 A single province with a "historical regional identity".

It also allowed for exceptions to the above criteria, in that the Spanish Parliament could:
 Authorize, in the nation's interest, the constitution of an autonomous community even if it was a single province without a historical regional identity.
 Authorize or grant autonomy to entities or territories that were not provinces.

The constitution also established two "routes" to accede to autonomy. The "fast route" or "fast track", also called the "exception", was established in article 151, and was implicitly reserved for the three "historical nationalities"—the Basque Country, Catalonia and Galicia—in that the very strict requirements to opt for this route were waived via the second transitory disposition for those territories that had approved a "Statute of Autonomy" during the Second Spanish Republic (otherwise, the constitution required the approval of three-fourths of the municipalities involved whose population would sum up at least the majority of the electoral census of each province, and required the ratification through a referendum with the affirmative vote of the absolute majority of the electoral census of each province—that is, of all registered citizens, not only of those who would vote).

The constitution also explicitly established that the institutional framework for these communities would be a parliamentary system, with a Legislative Assembly elected by universal suffrage, a cabinet or "council of government", a president of such a council, elected by the Assembly, and a High Court of Justice. They were also granted a maximum level of devolved competencies.

The "slow route" or "slow track", also called the "norm", was established in article 143. This route could be taken—via the first transitory disposition—by the "pre-autonomic regimes" that had been constituted in 1978, while the constitution was still being drafted, if approved by two-thirds of all municipalities involved whose population would sum up to at least the majority of the electoral census of each province or insular territory. These communities would assume limited powers during a provisional period of 5 years, after which they could assume further powers, upon negotiation with the central government. However, the constitution did not explicitly establish an institutional framework for these communities. They could have established a parliamentary system like the "historical nationalities", or they could have not assumed any legislative powers and simply established mechanisms for the administration of the powers they were granted.

Once the autonomous communities were created, Article 145 prohibits the "federation of autonomous communities". This was understood as any agreement between communities that would produce an alteration to the political and territorial equilibrium that would cause a confrontation between different blocks of communities, an action incompatible with the principle of solidarity and the unity of the nation.

The so-called "additional" and "transitory" dispositions of the constitution allowed for some exceptions to the above-mentioned framework. In terms of territorial organization, the fifth transitory disposition established that the cities of Ceuta and Melilla, Spanish exclaves located on the northern coast of Africa, could be constituted as "autonomous communities" if the absolute majority of the members of their city councils would agree on such a motion, and with the approval of the Spanish Parliament, which would exercise its prerogatives to grant autonomy to other entities besides provinces.

In terms of the scope of powers, the first additional disposition recognized the historical rights of the "chartered" territories, namely the Basque-speaking provinces, which were to be updated in accordance with the constitution. This recognition would allow them to establish a financial "chartered regime" whereby they would not only have independence to manage their own finances, like all other communities, but to have their own public financial ministries with the ability to levy and collect all taxes. In the rest of the communities, all taxes are levied and collected by or for the central government and then redistributed among all.

Autonomic pacts

The Statutes of Autonomy of the Basque Country and Catalonia were sanctioned by the Spanish Parliament on 18 December 1979. The position of the party in government, the Union of the Democratic Centre (UCD), was that only the three "historical nationalities" would assume full powers, while the rest would accede to autonomy via article 143, assuming fewer powers and perhaps not even establishing institutions of government. This was firmly opposed by the representatives of Andalusia, who demanded for their region the maximum level of powers granted to the "nationalities".

After a massive rally in support of autonomy, a referendum was organized for Andalusia to attain autonomy through the strict requirements of article 151, or the "fast route"—with UCD calling for abstention, and the main party in opposition in Parliament, the Spanish Socialist Workers' Party (PSOE) calling for a vote in favour. These requirements were not met, as in one of the eight provinces, Almería, votes in favour — although the plurality — did not amount to half of the electoral census as required. Yet, in general, the results of the referendum had been clear and unequivocal.

After several months of discussion, the then prime minister of Spain, Adolfo Suárez and the leader of the opposition, Felipe González, reached an agreement to resolve the Andalusian issue, whereby the Parliament approved an amendment to the law that regulated referendums, and used a prerogative of article 144c of the constitution, both actions which combined would allow Andalusia to take the fast route. They also agreed that no other region would take the "fast route", but that all regions would establish a parliamentary system with all institutions of government. This opened a phase that was dubbed as café para todos, "coffee for all". This agreement was eventually put into writing in July 1981 in what has been called the "first autonomic pacts".

These "autonomic pacts" filled in the gap left by the open character of the constitution. Among other things:
They described the final outline of the territorial division of Spain, with the specific number and name of the autonomous communities to be created.
They restricted the "fast-route" to the "historical nationalities" and Andalusia; all the rest had to take the "slow-route".
They established that all autonomous communities would have institutions of government within a parliamentary system.
They set up a deadline for all the remaining communities to be constituted: 1 February 1983.

In the end, 17 autonomous communities were created:
 Andalusia, and the three "historical nationalities"—the Basque Country, Catalonia and Galicia—took the "fast-route" and immediately assumed the maximum set of powers allowed in the constitution; the rest took the "slow route".
 Aragon, Castilla-La Mancha, Castile and León, Extremadura and the Valencian Community acceded to autonomy as communities integrated by two or more provinces with common historical, economic and cultural characteristics.
 The Balearic Islands and the Canary Islands acceded to autonomy as insular territories, the latter integrated by two provinces.
 Principality of Asturias, Cantabria, La Rioja and Murcia acceded to autonomy as single provinces with historical identity (also called "uniprovincial" autonomous communities).
 Navarre, as a single province, acceded to autonomy through the recognition, update and improvement of its historical and local "law" (charters; Spanish fueros), and as such, it is known as a "chartered community".
 The province of Madrid, home to the national capital, was removed from Castilla-La Mancha (formerly New Castile), to which it previously belonged, and constituted as a single-province autonomous community in the "national interest", the Community of Madrid.

Special provisions were made for the Valencian Community and the Canary Islands in that, although they took the "slow route", through the subsequent approval of specific organic laws, they were to assume full autonomy in less than 5 years, since they had started a process towards the "fast route" prior to the approval of the "autonomic pacts".

On the other hand, Cantabria and La Rioja, although originally part of Old Castile—and both originally included in the "pre-autonomic regime" of Castile and León—were granted autonomy as single provinces with historical identity, a move supported by the majority of their populations. The "autonomic pacts" give both Cantabria and La Rioja the option of being incorporated into Castile and León in the future, and required that the Statutes of Autonomy of all three communities include such a provision. León, a historical kingdom and historical region of Spain, once joined to Old Castile to form Castile and León, was denied secession to be constituted as an autonomous community on its own right.

During the second half of the 1980s, the central government seemed reluctant to transfer all powers to the "slow route" communities. After the five years set up by the constitution, all "slow route" communities demanded the maximum transfer guaranteed by the constitution. This led to what has been called the "second autonomic pacts" of 1992, between the then prime minister of Spain Felipe González from PSOE and the leader of the opposition, José María Aznar from the newly created People's Party (PP) successor of the People's Alliance party. Through these agreements new powers were transferred, with the reforms to many Statutes of Autonomy of the "slow-route" communities with the aim of equalizing them to the "fast route" communities. In 1995, the cities of Ceuta and Melilla were constituted as "autonomous cities" without legislative powers, but with an autonomous assembly not subordinated to any other province or community.

The creation of the autonomous communities was a diverse process, that started with the constitution, was normalized with the autonomic pacts and was completed with the Statutes of Autonomy. It is, however, an ongoing process; further devolution—or even the return of transferred powers—is always a possibility. This has been evidenced in the 2000s, at the beginning with a wave of approval of new Statutes of Autonomy for many communities, and more recently with many considering the recentralization of some powers in the wake of the economic and financial crisis of 2008. Nonetheless Spain is now a decentralized country with a structure unlike any other, similar but not equal to a federation, even though in many respects the country can be compared to countries which are undeniably federal. The unique resulting system is referred to as "Autonomous state", or more precisely "State of Autonomies".

Current state of affairs

With the implementation of the Autonomous Communities, Spain went from being one of the most centralized countries in the OECD to being one of the most decentralized; in particular, it has been the country where the incomes and outcomes of the decentralized bodies (the Autonomous Communities) has grown the most, leading this rank in Europe by 2015 and being fifth among OECD countries in tax devolution (after Canada, Switzerland, the United States and Austria). By means of the State of Autonomies implemented after the Spanish Constitution of 1978, Spain has been quoted to be "remarkable for the extent of the powers peacefully devolved over the past 30 years" and "an extraordinarily decentralized country", with the central government accounting for just 18% of public spending, 38% by the regional governments, 13% by the local councils, and the remaining 31% by the social security system.

In terms of personnel, by 2010 almost 1,350,000 people or 50.3% of the total civil servants in Spain were employed by the autonomous communities; city and provincial councils accounted for 23.6% and those employees working for the central administration (police and military included) represented 22.2% of the total.

Tensions within the system
Peripheral nationalism continues to play a key role in Spanish politics. Some peripheral nationalists view that there is a vanishing practical distinction between the terms "nationalities" and "regions", as more powers are transferred to all communities in roughly the same degree and as other communities have chosen to identify themselves as "nationalities". In fact, it has been argued that the establishment of the State of Autonomies "has led to the creation of "new regional identities", and "invented communities".

Many in Galicia, the Basque Country, and Catalonia view their communities as "nations", not just "nationalities", and Spain as a "plurinational state" or a "nation of nations", and they have made demands for further devolution or secession.

In 2004 the Basque Parliament approved the Ibarretxe Plan, whereby the Basque Country would approve a new Statute of Autonomy containing key provisions such as shared sovereignty with Spain, full independence of the judiciary, and the right to self-determination, and assuming all powers except that of the Spanish nationality law, defense, and monetary policy. The plan was rejected by the Spanish Parliament in 2005 and the situation has remained largely stable in that front so far.

A particularly contentious point – especially in Catalonia –  has been the one of fiscal tensions, with Catalan nationalists intensifying their demand for further financing during the 2010s. In this regard, the new rules for fiscal decentralisation in force since 2011 already make Spain one of the most decentralised countries in the world also in budgetary and fiscal matters, with the base for income tax split at 50/50 between the Spanish government and the regions (something unheard of in much bigger federal states such as Germany or the United States, which retain the income tax as an exclusively or primarily federal one). Besides, each region can also decide to set its own income tax bands and its own additional rates, higher or lower than the federal rates, with the corresponding income accruing to the region which no longer has to share it with other regions. This current level of fiscal decentralisation has been regarded by economists such as Thomas Piketty as troublesome since, in his view, "challenges the very idea of solidarity within the country and comes down to playing the regions against each other, which is particularly problematic when the issue is one of income tax as this is supposed to enable the reduction of inequalities between the richest and the poorest, over and above regional or professional identities".

Independence process in Catalonia 
The severe economic crisis in Spain that started in 2008 produced different reactions in the different communities. On one hand, some began to consider a return of some responsibilities to the central government while, on the other hand, in Catalonia debate on the fiscal deficit—Catalonia being one of the largest net contributors in taxes—led many to support secession. In September 2012, Artur Mas, then Catalonia's president, requested from the central government a new "fiscal agreement", with the possibility of giving his community powers of fiscal autonomy equal to those of the  chartered communities, but prime minister Mariano Rajoy refused. Mas dissolved the Catalan Parliament, called for new elections, and promised to conduct a referendum on independence within the next four years.

Rajoy's government declared that they would use all "legal instruments"—current legislation requires the central executive government or the Congress of Deputies to call for or sanction a binding referendum— to block any such attempt. The Spanish Socialist Workers' Party and its counterpart in Catalonia proposed to reopen the debate on the territorial organization of Spain, changing the constitution to create a true federal system to "better reflect the singularities" of Catalonia, as well as to modify the current taxation system.

On Friday 27 October 2017 the Catalan Parliament voted on the independence of Catalonia; the result was 70 in favor, 10 against, 2 neither, with 53 representatives not present in protest. In the following days, the members of the Catalan government either fled or were imprisoned.

One scholar summarises the current situation as follows:

the autonomous state appears to have come full circle, with reproaches from all sides. According to some, it has not gone far enough and has failed to satisfy their aspirations for improved self-government. For others it has gone too far, fostering inefficiency or reprehensible linguistic policies.

Constitutional and statutory framework
The State of Autonomies, as established in Article 2 of the constitution, has been argued to be based on four principles: willingness to accede to autonomy, unity in diversity, autonomy but not sovereignty of the communities, and solidarity among them all. The structure of the autonomous communities is determined both by the devolution allowed by the constitution and the powers assumed in their respective Statutes of Autonomy. While the autonomic agreements and other laws have allowed for an "equalization" of all communities, differences still remain.

The Statute of Autonomy

The Statute of Autonomy is the basic institutional law of the autonomous community or city, recognized by the Spanish constitution in article 147. It is approved by a parliamentary assembly representing the community, and then approved by the Cortes Generales, the Spanish Parliament, through an "Organic Law", requiring the favourable vote of the absolute majority of the Congress of Deputies.

For communities that acceded to autonomy through the "fast route", a referendum is required before it can be sanctioned by the Parliament. The Statutes of Autonomy must contain, at least, the name of the community, its territorial limits, the names, organization and seat of the institutions of government, the powers they assume and the principles for their bilingual policy, if applicable.

The constitution establishes that all powers not explicitly assumed by the State (the central government) in the constitution, can be assumed by the autonomous community in their Statutes of Autonomy; but also, all powers not explicitly assumed by the autonomous community in their Statutes of Autonomy are automatically assumed by the State. In case of conflict, the constitution prevails. In case of disagreement, any administration can bring the case before the Constitutional Court of Spain.

Institutional organization
All autonomous communities have a parliamentary system based on a division of powers comprising:
 A Legislative Assembly, whose members are elected by universal suffrage according to a system of proportional representation, in which all areas that integrate the territory are fairly represented
 A Council of Government, with executive and administrative powers, headed by a prime minister, whose official title is "president", elected by the Legislative Assembly—usually the leader of the party or coalition with a majority in the Assembly—and nominated by the King of Spain
 A High Court of Justice, hierarchically under the Supreme Court of Spain

The majority of the communities have approved regional electoral laws within the limits set up by the laws for the entire country. Despite minor differences, all communities use proportional representation following D'Hondt method; all members of regional parliaments are elected for four-year terms, but the president of the community has the faculty to dissolve the legislature and call for early elections. Nonetheless in all communities except for the Basque Country, Catalonia, Galicia, and Andalusia elections are held the last Sunday of May every four years, concurrent with municipal elections in all Spain.

The names of the Council of Government and the Legislative Assembly vary between communities. In some autonomous communities, these institutions are restored historical bodies of government or representation of the previous kingdoms or regional entities within the Spanish Crown—like the Generalitat of Catalonia—while others are entirely new creations.

In some, both the executive and the legislature, though constituting two separate institutions, are collectively identified with a single specific name. A specific denomination may not refer to the same branch of government in all communities; for example, junta may refer to the executive office in some communities, to the legislature in others, or to the collective name of all branches of government in others.

Given the ambiguity in the constitution that did not specify which territories were nationalities and which were regions, other territories, besides the implicit three "historical nationalities", have also chosen to identify themselves as nationalities, in accordance with their historical regional identity, such as Andalusia, Aragon, the Balearic Islands, the Canary Islands, and the Valencian Community.

The two autonomous cities have more limited powers than autonomous communities, but more than other municipalities. The executive is exercised by a president, who is also the mayor of the city. In the same way, limited legislative power is vested in a local assembly in which the deputies are also the city councillors.

Legal powers
The autonomic agreements of 1982 and 1992 tried to equalize powers devolved to the 17 autonomous communities, within the limits of the constitution and the differences guaranteed by it. This has led to an "asymmetrical homogeneity". In the words of the Constitutional Court of Spain in its ruling of August 5, 1983, the autonomous communities are characterized by their "homogeneity and diversity...equal in their subordination to the constitutional order, in the principles of their representation in the Senate, in their legitimation before the Constitutional Court, and in that the differences between the distinct Statutes [of Autonomy] cannot imply economic or social privileges; however, they can be unequal with respect to the process to accede to autonomy and the concrete determination of the autonomic content of their Statute, and therefore, in their scope of powers. The autonomic regime is characterized by an equilibrium between homogeneity and diversity ... Without the former there will be no unity or integration in the state's ensemble; without the latter, there would not be [a] true plurality and the capacity of self-government".

The asymmetrical devolution is a unique characteristic of the territorial structure of Spain, in that the autonomous communities have a different range of devolved powers. These were based on what has been called in Spanish as hechos diferenciales, "differential facts" or "differential traits".

This expression refers to the idea that some communities have particular traits, with respect to Spain as a whole. In practice these traits are a native "language proper to their own territories" separate from Spanish, a particular financial regime or special civil rights expressed in a code, which generate a distinct political personality. These hechos diferenciales of their distinct political and historical personality are constitutionally and statutorily (i. e., in their Statutes of Autonomy) recognized in the exceptions granted to some of them and the additional powers they assume.

The powers to be exercised can be divided into three groups: exclusive to the State or central government, shared powers, and devolved powers exclusive to the communities. Article 149 states which powers are exclusive to the central government: international relations, defense, administration of justice, commercial, criminal, civil, and labour legislation, customs, general finances and state debt, public health, basic legislation, and general coordination. All autonomous communities have the power to manage their own finances in the way they see fit, and are responsible for the administration of education—school and universities—health and social services and cultural and urban development. Yet there are differences as stipulated in their Statutes and the constitution:
 Aragon, the Balearic Islands, the Basque Country, Catalonia, Galicia and the Valencian Community have a regional civil code
 Basque Country, Catalonia, and Navarre have their own police corps—the Ertzaintza, the Mossos d'Esquadra and the Nafarroako Foruzaingoa, respectively; other communities have them too, but not fully developed (adscribed to the Spanish National Police) 
 The Canary Islands have a special financial regime in virtue of its location as an overseas territories, while the Basque Country and Navarre have a distinct financial regime called "chartered regime"
 The Balearic Islands, the Basque Country, Catalonia, Galicia, Navarre, and the Valencian Community have a co-official language and therefore a distinct linguistic regime

Degree of financial autonomy

How the communities are financed has been one of the most contentious aspects in their relationship with the central government. The constitution gave all communities significant control over spending, but the central government retained effective control of their revenue supply. That is, the central government is still charge of levying and collecting most taxes, which it then redistributes to the autonomous communities with the aim of producing "fiscal equalization". This applies to all communities, with the exception of the Basque Country and Navarre.

This financial scheme is known as the "common regime". In essence, fiscal equalization implies that richer communities become net contributors to the system, while poorer communities become net recipients. The two largest net contributors to the system are the Balearic Islands and the Community of Madrid, in percentage terms, or the Community of Madrid and Catalonia in absolute terms.

Central government funding is the main source of revenue for the communities of "common regime". Redistribution, or transfer payments, are given to the communities of common regime to manage the responsibilities they have assumed. The amount they receive is based upon several calculations which include a consideration for population, land area, administrative units, dispersal of population, relative poverty, fiscal pressure and insularity. The central government is committed to returning a specific percentage of taxes to all communities with common regime, within the differences allowed for fiscal equalization. The communities of common regime have the ability to add a surcharge to the so-called "ceded taxes"—taxes set at the central level, but collected locally—and they can lower or raise personal income taxes up to a limit.

The Basque Country and Navarre were granted an exception in the fiscal and financial system through the first additional disposition of the constitution that recognizes their historical "charters" —hence they are known as "communities of chartered regime" or "foral regime". Through their "chartered regime", these communities are allowed to levy and collect all so-called "contracted taxes", including income tax and corporate tax, and they have much more flexibility to lower or raise them. This "chartered" or "foral" contract entails true financial autonomy.

Since they collect almost all taxes, they send to the central government a pre-arranged amount known as cupo, "quota" or aportación, "contribution", and the treaty whereby this system is recognized is known as concierto, "treaty", or convenio, "pact". Hence they are also said to have concierto económico, an "economic treaty". Since they collect all taxes themselves and only send a prearranged amount to the central government for the powers exclusive to the State, they do not participate in "fiscal equalization", in that they do not receive any money back.

Spending
As more responsibilities have been assumed by the autonomous communities in areas such as social welfare, health, and education, public expenditure patterns have seen a shift from the central government towards the communities since the 1980s. In the late 2000s, autonomous communities accounted for 35% of all public expenditure in Spain, a percentage that is even higher than that of states within a federation. With no legal constraints to balance budgets, and since the central government retains control over fiscal revenue in the communities of common regime, these are in a way encouraged to build up debt.

The Council on Fiscal and Financial Policy, which includes representatives of the central government and of the autonomous communities, has become one of the most efficient institutions of coordination in matters of public expenditures and revenue. Through the Council several agreements of financing have been agreed, as well as limits to the communities' public debt. The Organic Law of the Financing of Autonomous Communities of 1988 requires that the communities obtain the authorization of the central Ministry of Finance to issue public debt.

Linguistic regimes

The preamble to the constitution explicitly stated that it is the nation's will to protect "all Spaniards and the peoples of Spain in the exercise of human rights, their cultures and traditions, languages and institutions". This is a significant recognition not only in that it differed drastically from the restrictive linguistic policies during the Franco era, but also because part of the distinctiveness of the "historical nationalities" lies on their own regional languages. The nation is thus openly multilingual, in which Castilian—that is, Spanish—is the official language in all territories, but the "other Spanish languages" can also be official in their respective communities, in accordance with their Statutes of Autonomy.

Article 3 of the constitution ends up declaring that the "richness of the distinct linguistic modalities of Spain represents a patrimony which will be the object of special respect and protection". Spanish remains the only official language of the State; other languages are only co-official with Spanish in the communities that have so regulated. In addition, knowledge of the Spanish language was declared a right and an obligation of all Spaniards.

Spanish legislation, most notably in the Statutes of Autonomy of the bilingual communities, use the term "own language", or "language proper to a community", to refer to a language other than Spanish that originated or had historical roots in that particular territory. The Statutes of Autonomy of the respective autonomous communities have declared Basque the language proper to the Basque Country and Navarre, Catalan the language proper to Catalonia, the Balearic Islands and the Valencian Community—where it is historically, traditionally and officially known as Valencian—and Galician to be the language proper to Galicia. There are other protected regional languages in other autonomous communities. As a percentage of total population in Spain, Basque is spoken by 2%, Catalan/Valencian by 17%, and Galician by 7% of all Spaniards. A 2016 Basque Government census revealed 700,000 fluent speakers in Spain (51,000 in Basque counties in France) and 1,185.000 total when passive speakers are included.

Subdivisions

The Spanish constitution recognizes the municipalities and guarantees their autonomy, meaning the right to manage their own affairs through freely elected assemblies. Municipal, or city, councils are in charge of the municipalities' government and administration, and they are led by a mayor and councillors, the latter elected by universal suffrage, and the former elected either by the councillors or by suffrage.

Provinces are recognized by the constitution as groups of municipalities. Their powers and institutions of government vary greatly among communities. In all communities which have more than one province, provinces are governed by a provincial council, with a limited scope of administrative powers.

In the Basque Country, the provinces, renamed as "historical territories", are governed by "chartered councils"—which assume the powers of a provincial council as well as the fiscal powers of their "chartered community"—and "General Juntas" —parliaments with legislative powers.

In the Canary Islands and the Balearic Islands, each major island is governed by an "island council". In Catalonia, the provincial councils have very little power, as another territorial subdivision called the comarques has been created.

In those seven autonomous communities formed by a single province, the provincial councils have been replaced by the communities' institutions of government; in fact, the provinces themselves are not only coterminous with the communities, but correspond in essence to the communities themselves. The two-tier territorial organization common to most communities—first province, then municipalities—is therefore non-existent in these "uniprovincial" communities.

The constitution also allows the creation of other territorial entities formed by groups of municipalities. One of such territorial subdivision is the comarca (equivalent of a "district", "shire", or "county"). While all communities have unofficial historical, cultural, or natural comarcas, only in Aragon and Catalonia, they have been legally recognized as territorial entities with administrative powers (see comarcal councils).

Powers exercised by the autonomous governments
The powers of the autonomous communities are not homogeneous. Broadly the powers are divided into "Exclusive", "Shared", and "Executive" ("partial"). In some cases, the autonomous community may have exclusive responsibility for the administration of a policy area but may only have executive (i. e., carries out) powers as far as the policy itself is concerned, meaning it must enforce policy and laws decided at the national level.

See also

 Autonomous administrative division
 Autonomous Communities Administration
 Autonomous Regions of Portugal
 List of current presidents of the autonomous communities of Spain
 List of Spanish autonomous communities by gross domestic product
 List of Spanish autonomous communities by Human Development Index
 Manuel Clavero
 Political divisions of Spain
 President (Autonomous community)
 Ranked lists of Spanish autonomous communities

Notes

Translation of terms

References

External links
Information about Spain's Autonomous Communities from rulers.org
Relations between tiers – CityMayors feature

 
Subdivisions of Spain
Autonomous communities
Spain 1
Spain
Autonomous administrative divisions
Decentralization
1979 establishments in Spain